Austin Executive Airpark , formerly known as Tim's Airpark (in the 1960s and 1970s), was a public-use airport located in Austin, Texas, United States.  It was located near the intersection of Parmer Lane and Interstate 35.

The property was purchased by nearby Dell Computers with the intentions of using it to expand its warehouse facilities.  The airport was permanently closed on May 1, 1999.

In 2011, another existing airport, Bird's Nest Airport , located in nearby Manor, Texas, was expanded and renamed Austin Executive Airport.

References

External links 
 Aerial photo as of February 1995 from USGS The National Map
 Aeronautical chart

Defunct airports in Texas
Transportation in Austin, Texas
1999 disestablishments in Texas
Airports in Greater Austin